Autosadism, or automasochism, is behaviour inflicting pain or humiliation on oneself. It may be related to self-harm or a paraphilia involving sexual arousal. It can be viewed as a form of masochism, a sublimated form of sadism, or a means to experiencing algolagnia, a sexual tendency which is defined by deriving sexual pleasure and stimulation from physical pain.

See also
Self-defeating personality disorder
Self-destructive behaviour

Notes

References

 

Paraphilias